Playa Hermosa is a resort (balneario) in the Maldonado Department of southeastern Uruguay.

Location
It borders the resort Playa Verde to the northwest and the resort Playa Grande to the southeast.

Population
In 2011 Playa Hermosa had a population of 611 permanent inhabitants and 1,413 dwellings.
 
Source: Instituto Nacional de Estadística de Uruguay

References

External links
INE map of Las Flores, Playa Verde, Playa Hermosa and Playa Grande

Populated places in the Maldonado Department
Beaches of Uruguay
Seaside resorts in Uruguay